The enzyme oleate hydratase catalyzes the chemical reaction

(R)-10-hydroxystearate  oleate + H2O

This enzyme belongs to the family of lyases, specifically the hydro-lyases, which cleave carbon-oxygen bonds.  The systematic name of this enzyme class is (R)-10-hydroxystearate 10-hydro-lyase (oleate-forming). This enzyme is also called (R)-10-hydroxystearate 10-hydro-lyase.

References

 
 
 

EC 4.2.1
Enzymes of unknown structure